The list of ship decommissionings in 1998 includes a chronological list of all ships decommissioned in 1998.


See also 

1998
 Ship decommissionings
Ship